The Gaelic Athletic Association-Gaelic Players' Association All Stars Awards (often known simply as the All Stars) are awarded annually to the best player in each of the 15 playing positions in Gaelic football and hurling. Additionally, one player in each code is selected as Player of the Year.

The awards were instituted in 1971. Since 2011 they have been presented jointly by the Gaelic Athletic Association and the representative body for inter-county players, the Gaelic Players Association.

Each player who receives a nomination is given a medallion marking the milestone.

It is considered "the most coveted sporting award scheme in the country". Equivalent awards exist for ladies' football, rounders and camogie.

History and procedure
Since the 1960s there had been a tradition of annually selecting the best player in each position, in football and hurling, to create a special team of the year. Between 1963 and 1967 these players received what was known as the Cú Chulainn award. In 1971 these awards were formalised into the annual GAA All Star Awards. In 2006 the Gaelic Players Association launched a parallel award scheme entitled the GPA Gaelic Team of the Year (often referred to as the GPA Awards). An annual award was also given by the GPA to the Footballer of the Year and the Hurler of the Year.

In 2011 it was announced that the GAA All Stars Awards, which had been sponsored in recent years by Vodafone, and the GPA Awards would merge under the sponsorship of car manufacturer Opel. The move announced by Christy Cooney saw the achievements of players recognised jointly for the first time in October 2011.

The All Stars team comprises the best player in each position, regardless of club or county affiliation. The composition of the All Star teams are decided on the basis of a shortlist compiled by a selection committee of sports journalists from the national media, while the overall winners are chosen by inter-county players themselves. The award is regarded by players as the highest accolade available to them, due to it being picked by their peers. The awards are presented at a gala banquet in November following the end of the Championship season. Both men's teams are honoured with a special holiday where they play an exhibition game. Since 1971 over 1,000 players have been honoured with All Stars Awards. Damien Martin of the Offaly hurling team was the first ever recipient of the award, while in 2004 Paul Galvin of the Kerry football team became the 1,000th winner of the award.

Carlow and Longford are the only counties in Ireland not to receive an award in either sport.

In September 2017 PwC became the new sponsors of the All Star Awards on a four year deal, with the awards being re-named The PwC All-Stars.

Winners
For a complete listing of all winners see the following articles:
 All Stars Footballer of the Year
 All Stars Hurler of the Year
 List of All Stars Awards winners (football)
 List of All Stars Awards winners (hurling)
 All-Time All Star Award (football)
 All-Time All Star Award (hurling)
 Ladies' Gaelic football All Stars Awards (Winners)
 Camogie All Stars Awards (Winners)
 Rounders All Stars Awards (Winners: Men / Women)

Records

Brothers
Twenty two sets of brothers have won All Star Awards in hurling. They are:
Colm, Conal and Cormac Bonnar of Tipperary
Tom and Jim Cashman of Cork
Andy and Martin Comerford of Kilkenny
John and Joe Connolly of Galway
Jimmy and Joe Cooney of Galway
Ollie and Joe Canning of Galway
Johnny, Billy and Joe Dooley of Offaly
Colm and Tony Doran of Wexford
Liam and Ger Fennelly of Kilkenny
Pat, Ger and John Henderson of Kilkenny
Eoin and Paul Kelly of Tipperary
Brian and Frank Lohan of Clare
Willie and Eddie O'Connor of Kilkenny
Seán Óg and Setanta Ó hAilpín of Cork
Aidan and Bobby Ryan of Tipperary
Martin and John Quigley of Wexford
Michael and Colin Fennelly of Kilkenny
Dan Shanahan and Maurice Shanahan of Waterford
Pádraic Maher and Ronan Maher of Tipperary
Noel McGrath and John McGrath of Tipperary
Tommy Walsh and Pádraig Walsh of Kilkenny
Cathal Mannion and Pádraic Mannion of Galway

One set of twins have won All Star Awards in hurling:
Jerry and Ben O'Connor of Cork

Twelve sets of brothers have won All Star Awards in Gaelic football. They are:
Matt and Richie Connor of Offaly
Tomás and Liam Connor of Offaly
Paul and Dermot Earley Snr of Roscommon
Seán and Brendan Lowry of Offaly
James and Martin McHugh of Donegal
Mark and Ryan McHugh of Donegal
Anthony and John McGurk of Derry
Tom, Mick and Pat Spillane of Kerry
Tomás, Darragh and Marc Ó Sé of Kerry
Kenneth and Conor Mortimer of Mayo
Alan and Bernard Brogan Jnr of Dublin
Seán Cavanagh and Colm Cavanagh of Tyrone

One set of brothers has won All Star Awards in hurling and football (with two different counties):
Declan Carr won his hurling award while playing with Tipperary and Tommy Carr won his football award while playing with Dublin.

Father and son
Sixteen father and son pairings have won All Star Awards.

Thirteen of these have been in football. Of the thirteen, two fathers have each been followed by two sons, therefore a total of four father and son pairings:
Bernard Brogan Snr, plus Alan Brogan and Bernard Brogan Jnr of Dublin.
Martin McHugh, plus Mark McHugh and Ryan McHugh of Donegal.

The other nine father and son pairings are:
Pat Reynolds and Paddy Reynolds of Meath.
Dermot Earley Snr and Dermot Earley Jnr of Roscommon and Kildare.
Liam O'Neill of Galway and Kevin O'Neill of Mayo.
Frank McGuigan and Brian McGuigan of Tyrone.
Tim Kennelly and Tadhg Kennelly of Kerry.
Denis 'Ógie' Moran and David Moran of Kerry.
Noel McCaffrey and Jack McCaffrey of Dublin.
Barney Rock and Dean Rock of Dublin.
Val Daly and John Daly of Galway.

There have been three hurling father and son pairings:
Fan Larkin and Philly Larkin of Kilkenny.
Richie Power Snr and Richie Power Jnr of Kilkenny.
Ken Hogan and Brian Hogan of Tipperary.

Dual All Stars
One player, Ray Cummins of Cork, holds the unique record of winning a hurling and a football All Star in the same year (1971).

Three other players share the distinction of winning All Star awards in both hurling and football, but they did not win the accolades in the same year. These players are:
 Jimmy Barry-Murphy of Cork
 Brian Murphy of Cork
 Liam Currams of Offaly

Players with most wins

Unique achievements
Tommy Walsh of Kilkenny won nine consecutive hurling All Star Awards in a record five different positions. These were for playing at left corner back (1), at right half back (5), at left half back (1), at midfield (1) and at left half forward (1).

Henry Shefflin of Kilkenny holds the record for most All Star Awards in the one position with seven at centre-forward.

Brian Fenton and Brian Howard, both from Raheny and Dublin were the first midfield to be selected from one club.

Shortly after his 90th birthday, Mícheál Ó Muircheartaigh was awarded the only All Star of 2020. No further All Stars could be awarded as competition was suspended due to the COVID-19 pandemic and only completed that December.

References

External links
 All Stars at the Gaelic Athletic Association
 2007 at The Irish Times
 2007 at the Sunday Tribune
 50 years of the GAA All-Stars - 'You were given the five-star glitz and glamour of an Oscar night'

 
1971 establishments in Ireland
Annual events in Ireland
Awards established in 1971